Bernie Winters (born Bernie Weinstein; 6 September 1930 – 4 May 1991), was an English comedian, actor, musician & TV presenter, and the comic foil of the double act Mike and Bernie Winters with his older brother, Mike. Winters later performed solo, often with the aid of his St Bernard dog, Schnorbitz.

Biography
Bernie Winters was born Bernard Weinstein, at the City of London Maternity Hospital, 102 City Road, Holborn, on 6 September 1930. His father was a bookmaker. Bernie served in the merchant navy and performed as a musician at dances and weddings before forming the double act Mike & Bernie Winters with his brother Mike, whom he called "Choochie-Face" on stage. In October 1957 the duo appeared on Six-Five Special and were described in the Daily Mirror as top comics for Britain's teenage TV audience. They had been recommended to the show's presenter Josephine Douglas by Tommy Steele with whom they had been on a stage tour. They both left the show the same day that she did, on 10 May 1958.

The two brothers split up in 1978, and Bernie hosted his own comedy show, Bernie (1978–1980) for ITV. In the late 1970s and early 1980s Bernie also presented The Big Top Variety Show, a television series of variety shows from a circus ring. In 1984 he presented the second series of the game show Whose Baby? He also became a regular on shows such as Punchlines and Give Us A Clue and gave an impression of Bud Flanagan on television and later on stage, with Leslie Crowther as Flanagan's partner Chesney Allen.

Winters was a member of the show business fraternity, the Grand Order of Water Rats.

Winters appeared as himself in London Weekend Television sitcom Bottle Boys in 1985.

On 14 August 1990, after several months of discomfort and stomach pains, he had a nine-hour operation on his stomach. Cancer was removed. However, though he was never told, Winters' condition was already terminal, and he died on 4 May 1991, at The London Clinic at the age of 60.

Bernie was cremated at Golders Green Crematorium in London on 8 May, and his ashes interred in the Garden of Remembrance. A memorial plaque was erected in the West Memorial Court there.

Partial filmography
 Six-Five Special (1958) – Himself 
 Idol on Parade (1959) – Joseph Jackson
 Jazz Boat (1960) – The Jinx
 Let's Get Married (1960) – Bernie
 In the Nick (1960) – Jinx Shortbottom
 Johnny Nobody (1961) – Photographer
 Play it Cool (1962) – Sydney Norman
 The Cool Mikado (1963) – Bernie
 Simon, Simon (1970) – Man on roof with book
 Confessions from the David Galaxy Affair (1979) – Mr. Pringle
 Mary Millington's World Striptease Extravaganza (1981) – Blue comedian

References

External links

The 1967 album Mike and Bernie Winters In Toyland

1929 births
1991 deaths
English male television actors
English male comedians
Jewish English male actors
Jewish English comedians
Male actors from London
Deaths from stomach cancer
People from Islington (district)
Golders Green Crematorium
20th-century British male actors
20th-century English comedians
Deaths from cancer in England